Rendezvous in Space is a 1964 documentary film about the future of space exploration, directed by Frank Capra. It is notable for being the final film that Frank Capra directed. The film was funded by Martin Marietta and was shown at the Hall of Science Pavilion of the 1964-1965 New York World's Fair. Animated sections illustrate the invention of gunpowder, a space shuttle resupplying a space station, and the problems to be overcome living for long periods in space.

References

External links

1964 films
American short documentary films
Documentary films about outer space
Films directed by Frank Capra
World's fair films
1964 documentary films
1964 New York World's Fair
American animated documentary films
New York Hall of Science